Country Music is a documentary miniseries created and directed by Ken Burns and written by Dayton Duncan that premiered on PBS on September 15, 2019. The eight-part series chronicles the history and prominence of country music in American culture.

Production 
Burns announced the miniseries in January 2014, with a projected airdate in 2018. Burns cited his ongoing work on other documentary projects as having affected progress on the series. Writer Dayton Duncan explained that the goal of the series was to demonstrate that country music "isn't and never was just one type of music. It was always this amalgam of American music and it sprang from a lot of very different roots and then, as it grew, it sprouted many different branches, but they're all connected." Burns filmed a total of 175 hours of interviews with 101 artists and other personalities for the series; some were recorded as early as 2012, and some of the interviewees (such as Little Jimmy Dickens, Roy Clark, Ralph Stanley, and Merle Haggard) died over the course of production.

Broadcast 
The miniseries premiered in the US on September 15, 2019, as a series of eight two-hour episodes. As a prelude to the premiere, Burns hosted a concert special filmed at the Ryman Auditorium, featuring Dierks Bentley, Rosanne Cash, Rodney Crowell, and Marty Stuart among others, which aired September 8, 2019.

A completely reedited version produced in conjunction with BBC Four, consisting of 9 50-minute episodes, began airing in the UK on November 22, 2019.

Music
The TV series presented country music from its earliest stars, such as the Carter Family, and Jimmie Rodgers, followed by influential singers of the likes of Hank Williams, through to notable acts of the second half of the 20th century such as Johnny Cash, Willie Nelson and Dolly Parton, finishing in the 1990s. A  five-CD soundtrack album of selected highlights of songs featured in the show, Country Music: A Film By Ken Burns, was released. The five-CD box-set was released on August 30, 2019 before the show aired, followed by two-CD, two-LP and digital versions released on September 13. It reached No. 1 on Billboard's Soundtrack Album Sales chart. It has sold 39,100 copies in the United States as of March 2020.

In support of the release of the miniseries, Bank of America produced a video of the song "Wagon Wheel", featuring a collection of musicians from across the United States, with the tag line "Nothing connects the country like country."

Release

Home media
The film was released through PBS in the United States on Blu-ray disc and DVD on September 17, 2019.
The series debuted at No. 6 on the Music Video Sales chart the week of September 28, 2019 climbing to No. 1 the following week, staying at the top position for eleven consecutive weeks. 

The 8-disc DVD/Blu-ray release of the documentary series also includes interviews from a large number of outtakes made by Burns during the production of the film. The biographical outtakes by various artists are featured on the special features of each of the three disc in the DVD release of the miniseries.

Soundtrack

Episodes

Reception 
Country Music has received generally positive reviews from television critics. Review aggregator site Rotten Tomatoes gave the series an 84% fresh rating, based on 22 reviews. The aggregator consensus states the series "an expansive—if not always deep—history of the genre as seen through Ken Burns' expert eye, Country Music works as both a crash course for new listeners and a refresher for old-timers."

David Cantwell of The New Yorker wrote, "What the documentary gets right overwhelms the caveats. Burns' chief takeaway from his immersion in the genre is spot on: country music is not, and has never been, static." David Fear of Rolling Stone wrote, "Most of all, this epic, essential survey (which premieres on September 15th) is both a history lesson of an American art form and 20th century U.S.A. itself. Like Burns' 2001 deep dive Jazz, it puts the music's cultural and geographic roots front and center." Will Hermes of Rolling Stone wrote, "The most ambitious, culturally resonant music documentary ever made."

Jon Caramanica of The New York Times wrote, "Country Music makes it plain that the story of the genre is merely a pocket version of the story of the American musical experiment writ large: Everyone trying on poses and costumes, borrowing wildly at every turn, pointing fingers at others trying similar things, and, as soon as things become complacent, agitating for something new." Ken Tucker of NPR wrote, "In Country Music, Burns goes wide, not deep; it's rare for any musical excerpt to last more than 20 seconds, making it impossible for a singer to make an impression on a viewer unfamiliar with his or her work. This time around, Burns has traveled down Hank Williams' 'Lost Highway' with a busted GPS." Tim Goodman of The Hollywood Reporter wrote, "Country Music is a wide subject that Burns painstakingly brushes through. But there's not enough paint for that picture. You're going to see the canvas and the blotches. If you know that going in, it helps."

John Anderson of The Wall Street Journal wrote, "Ken Burns' eight-part, 16-hour series paints tells an expansive, inclusive story of the narrative-driven music." Caroline Framke of Variety wrote, "The new docuseries is reverent and exhaustive in its attempt to summarize almost a century of American music." Hank Stuever of The Washington Post wrote, "Burns delivers an enlightening, educational and often emotionally stirring account of country's essential evolution (still in progress), from traditional immigrant and church songs heard in the misty mountain hollers to a powerful, Nashville-centric industry that grew to favor predictable hits over authentic origins. I cried three times while making my way through it, moved by the music but also by the common thread of suffering that travels through those who create it."

References 

Films directed by Ken Burns
Documentary films about country music and musicians
2019 American television series debuts